The 2016 Heart of Dallas Bowl was a postseason American college football bowl game played on December 27, 2016, at the Cotton Bowl in Dallas, Texas. The seventh edition of the Heart of Dallas Bowl, the game featured the Army Black Knights, an independent, and the North Texas Mean Green of Conference USA. It was one of the 2016–17 bowl games that concluded the 2016 FBS football season. Sponsored by fast food restaurant Zaxby's, the game was officially known as the Zaxby's Heart of Dallas Bowl. Broadcast on ESPN, Army defeated North Texas by a score of 38–31.

Teams 
The game featured the Army Black Knights, an FBS independent, and the North Texas Mean Green from Conference USA. This was the sixth meeting between the schools, with Army entering the game leading the all-time series 4–1. They first met on the football field in 1996, and later met in 1997, 2009, and 2010, all of which were won by Army. North Texas achieved their first victory in the series in their fifth meeting, which came earlier in the regular season on October 22, 2016. It was the first postseason meeting between the two teams.

Army 

After a disappointing 2–10 campaign the year prior, Army looked to return to winning ways in head coach Jeff Monken's third season. Army's season opened on the road in Philadelphia, where they defeated Temple to win their first season-opening road game since 2010. The Black Knights' home opener came the following week, when they hosted and defeated Rice, by a score of 31–14. The following week, Army was back on the road for the start of a three-game away stretch, the first game of which came at UTEP, whom they defeated to achieve their first 3–0 start to a season since 1996. The next two games were not so kind, however; the Black Knights faltered both in games at Buffalo, by three points in overtime, and, after a bye week, at Duke, by seven points. Army improved to 4–2 the next week at home, with their defeat of Lafayette, from the FCS's Patriot League. The following week, they matched up with eventual bowl game foe North Texas, to whom they lost by seventeen points. Army's first and only Power Five win came the next week, as they traveled to Winston-Salem and defeated Wake Forest by eight.

Now sitting at 5–3, they needed to win one of their next two games to ensure bowl eligibility, however they lost both of those games, to Air Force and Notre Dame, respectively, putting them at 5–5 with two contests to go. Army achieved their sixth win of the season on November 19, with a 60–3 victory against Morgan State, but as this was their second win of the year against an FCS opponent, it did not count towards their bowl eligibility (as only one FCS win per year can count towards the six wins traditionally required to be bowl eligible). Ordinarily, this would have meant that Army would be ineligible for postseason play, but as there were eighty bowl slots that were not all able to be filled, 5-win teams were admitted to postseason play based on Academic Progress Rates (APR). Because of this, Army accepted their invitation to play in the Heart of Dallas Bowl on December 4. Incidentally, the Black Knights would go on to upset No. 25 Navy in the Army–Navy Game just six days later, in their first win over the Midshipmen since 2001, thereby granting them enough wins to be traditionally bowl eligible anyway.

This was Army's sixth bowl appearance in school history, their first since the 2010 Armed Forces Bowl. This was also their first appearance in the Heart of Dallas Bowl.

North Texas 

North Texas entered 2016 under the leadership of new head coach Seth Littrell, who was brought in to lead the program after the Mean Green finished 2015 with a record of 1–11. The Mean Green opened the season with a Safeway Bowl matchup against SMU, in which they fell 21–34. They rebounded the next week, defeating Bethune–Cookman by three touchdowns. Their only Power Five game of the season saw them travel to No. 23 Florida, where they were shut out. They pulled back up to .500 with their week four win at Rice, a win that took two overtimes to complete. Again they faltered, this time against Middle Tennessee at home. Now 2–3, North Texas improved their record by doubling their win total over the following three weeks: they defeated Marshall at home, and then traveled to West Point and defeated Army following a bye week.

The next three weeks were not as kind to the Mean Green. A road game against UTSA, a home tilt against Louisiana Tech, and a road matchup with Western Kentucky all resulted in losses for North Texas, putting them at a precarious 4–6. Faced with two remaining regular season games, UNT needed to win both in order to become bowl eligible. They faced Southern Miss in their last home game of the season, and it was a game that resulted in a much-needed six-point win for the Mean Green. Needing a win in their last regular season game against UTEP, North Texas fell behind 7–31 in the second quarter and was never able to recover, losing 24–52. The result of this, as a post-game Associated Press report put it, was that North Texas was "knocked...out of bowl eligibility." However, this did not end up being the case. As was the case with Army (who had a 5–6 record when they were invited), 5–7 North Texas, despite having a losing record, was extended an invitation due to the lack of teams to fill all eighty bowl slots, and their high APR scores. They accepted said invitation on December 4, booking their trip to Dallas for a rematch with the Black Knights.

This was North Texas's ninth bowl appearance in school history, and their second appearance in the Heart of Dallas Bowl. Their last appearance in the game, and their last bowl appearance overall, was in the 2014 Heart of Dallas Bowl played at the conclusion of the 2013 season.

Game summary

Scoring summary

Statistics

References

External links
 Game summary at ESPN

2016–17 NCAA football bowl games
2016
2016 Heart of Dallas Bowl
2016 Heart of Dallas Bowl
2016 in sports in Texas
December 2016 sports events in the United States
2010s in Dallas
2016 in Texas